The Game of Love is the Greek singer Helena Paparizou's second English-language international album after the release of My Number One in 2005. It was first released in Greece on 25 October 2006. The album is composed of 12 tracks and a bonus track; seven of these had been previously released on Paparizou's previous album Iparhi Logos, and another was released exclusively to Scandinavia as the official song of the European Athletics Championships. Five of the songs were just English translations of Greek songs as well as two covers. The album was Paparizou's second album in Scandinavia. The album has enjoyed mild success in Greece and Cyprus  where it topped the charts and quickly attained platinum certification, while it failed to chart in other countries.

Album information
Released as an attempt to break the international market, the album was originally intended to be released all over Europe, including France and the United Kingdom, Australia, Canada, North Africa and Asia, in at least 45 countries initially, with a possible release in the United States. However, after little to no promotional performances by Paparizou, and the failure of the album in Sweden and lack of success of the singles, the international release of the album became an aborted project by Sony BMG and thus it was released in only 14 countries. Paparizou had also stated at the time, that she did not wish to leave her family and loved ones behind in Greece, to go out and try to make a career internationally. She had stated that if it meant to be, it will happen on its own.

The album contains 13 tracks, 7 of which have already been released, 6 songs are English translations of Greek songs released on album Helena's previous album Υπάρχει Λόγος. The song "Heroes" has already been released as a single in Finland and Sweden. The 6 remaining tracks have been written especially for this album. It also includes the hit single "Mambo!" which had success in many charts around the world. In the Japanese version of The Game of Love, "It's Gone Tomorrow" is not included.

The songs "Carpe Diem (Seize the Day)" and "Teardrops" have been written by Elena herself. There is also a bonus track called "Ό,τι Αξίζει Είναι Οι Στιγμές" (Oti Axizi Ine I Stigmes (Le Bonheur)), which was originally a song by Manos Hadjidakis, and was a big hit in France in 1962. "You Set My Heart on Fire" belongs to Tina Charles.

In December 2007, the song "It's Gone Tomorrow" (Iparhi Logos) (Originally track 9) was removed from The Game of Love because of problems with the original lyricist. All copies with the track still on store shelves were returned to Sony BMG with new copies being sent out minus that track.  The new version also came with the Nokia logo on the front cover, as well as Helena's Nokia advertisement picture inside the CD booklet. The CD also comes in a special paper case that the jewel case slides into.

Track listing

Bonus tracks
South African Edition

Japanese Edition

Singles
"Mambo!"
The first single from the album was "Mambo!".  The song was released as a CD single almost a full year prior to the album's release in Greece and Cyprus in November 2005. After the album's release, the song was released all across Europe where it charted on various national charts, as well as the United States.

"Heroes"
The second single from the album was "Heroes".  The song was the official theme song of the 2006 European Championships in Athletics in Sweden. The song was released only in Sweden as a CD single in August 2006, prior to the album's release, where it topped the Swedish single charts.

"Gigolo"
The third single from the album was "Gigolo".  The song was released as a radio single in Greece and Cyprus in July 2006, prior to the album's release.  The song was later released as a CD single in Scandinavia, where it charted on various national charts.

"Teardrops"
The last single from the album was "Teardrops". The song was only released to radio stations in Greece and Cyprus in December 2006, where it reached number one on both of the countries respective airplay charts.

Release history

Charts

References

External links
Helena's official website

Helena Paparizou albums
2006 albums
Albums produced by Twin
Sony Music Greece albums